The 1991 San Marino Grand Prix was a Formula One motor race held at Imola on 28 April 1991. The 61-lap race was the third race of the 1991 Formula One season and was won from pole position by Ayrton Senna, driving a McLaren-Honda, with team-mate Gerhard Berger second and JJ Lehto third in a Dallara-Judd.

Pre-race
With the team under new management having been sold by Cyril De Rouvre, Stefan Johansson was replaced at AGS by Formula One debutant Fabrizio Barbazza.

Qualifying

Pre-qualifying report
In the pre-qualifying session on Friday morning, Andrea de Cesaris was fastest in the Jordan, just under four tenths of a second faster than JJ Lehto's Dallara in second. De Cesaris' team-mate Bertrand Gachot was third, just a few hundredths behind Lehto. The fourth pre-qualifier was Eric van de Poele in the Lambo, who edged out the second Dallara of Emanuele Pirro. It was van de Poele's first progression through to the main qualifying sessions, and the first time in 1991 that a Dallara had failed to pre-qualify.

Apart from Pirro, those who failed to pre-qualify included Olivier Grouillard in the new British-built Fomet-1 chassis debuted by the Fondmetal team. Despite teething troubles which prevented him from progressing any further, Grouillard said he was happy with the new car. Seventh was the other Lambo of Nicola Larini, and bottom of the time sheets was Pedro Chaves in the sole Coloni, who suffered a gearbox failure during the session.

Pre-qualifying classification

Qualifying report
Ayrton Senna claimed his 55th pole position from Riccardo Patrese, Alain Prost, Nigel Mansell and Gerhard Berger.

Qualifying classification

Race

Race report
The formation lap saw two dramatic incidents: Prost spun off the track at Rivazza Turn, followed by Berger, who was able to continue. However Prost stalled the engine and did not take the start.

At the lights, Patrese took the lead ahead of Senna, whilst Mansell, already slow off the line with gearbox problems, retired at the end of lap 1 after a collision with Martin Brundle. He was followed out by Nelson Piquet who spun off on lap 2, Aguri Suzuki who spun off on lap 3 behind the leaders and Jean Alesi who also spun off on lap 3 attempting a rather foolhardy pass on Stefano Modena.

In a strong lead, Patrese pitted for originally what appeared to be an early stop to slicks turned out to be more serious – a misfire with a faulty camshaft sensor. He restarted last before retiring for good 9 laps later.

Berger was catching Senna, lapping 1.5 seconds quicker than his teammate. The lead was soon down to 5 seconds, with Modena a superb third from Satoru Nakajima and the two Minardis of Pierluigi Martini and Gianni Morbidelli.

Both McLarens pitted for tyres with Senna maintaining his lead. Just after setting fastest lap, Berger was delayed in traffic, held up by the trio of Maurício Gugelmin, Julian Bailey and Thierry Boutsen. Bailey himself moved past Andrea de Cesaris into 6th, whilst Nakajima retired with transmission problems.

Ivan Capelli spun into retirement from fourth to hand over to JJ Lehto's Dallara. Modena retired with transmission problems which meant that behind the two dominant McLarens, the order was now Roberto Moreno, Lehto, Eric van de Poele for the little Modena team and Martini's Minardi. Meanwhile, de Cesaris eventually retired in the pits with gearbox problems on lap 38.

Moreno's gearbox broke on lap 52 causing him to retire, whilst Senna was having problems with oil pressure caused by the special high-torque Honda V12. As the Leyton House of Maurício Gugelmin eventually retired with an engine failure on lap 58. Berger put in a series of fastest laps to cut Senna's lead to just 1.7s at the line. Eric van de Poele had retired on the last lap as the result of fuel pump problems.

Lehto was overjoyed to gain the first podium place of his career for Dallara, with Martini fourth. Van de Poele's drive ended when a fuel pump broke on the last lap – he was classified ninth overall. The Lotus drivers of Mika Häkkinen and Bailey took fifth and sixth, both scoring their first world championship points, an unexpected result for the troubled team since their cars had barely managed to get on to the grid with Häkkinen 25th and Bailey 26th. This race was also noted for being the only Formula One point for Julian Bailey.

Race classification

Championship standings after the race

Drivers' Championship standings

Constructors' Championship standings

References

San Marino Grand Prix
San Marino Grand Prix
San Marino Grand Prix